Cavinas Airport  is an airstrip serving the Beni River town of Puerto Cavinas (de) and the Cavinas Mission in the Beni Department of Bolivia.

See also

Transport in Bolivia
List of airports in Bolivia

References

External links 
OpenStreetMap - Cavinas
OurAirports - Cavinas
HERE/Nokia Maps - Cavinas

Airports in Beni Department